is a Japanese professional baseball player. He was born on December 8, 1988 in Kakogawa, Hyogo, Japan. He has been with the Hokkaido Nippon-Ham Fighters for three years.

References

1988 births
Living people
Baseball people from Hyōgo Prefecture
Toyo University alumni
Japanese baseball players
Nippon Professional Baseball pitchers
Hokkaido Nippon-Ham Fighters players
Yomiuri Giants players